The 1976 PBA season was the second season of the Philippine Basketball Association (PBA).

Season highlights
The Crispa Redmanizers won all three conferences in the year to cap the first Grand Slam in the PBA. 
On December 21, Crispa achieved the first PBA Grandslam by winning the All-Philippine championship with a 110–92 win over Toyota Tamaraws in the deciding Game five of the finals. The Redmanizers, reinforced by Cyrus Mann and Bill Bunton, were down 0–2 in the series but won the last three games against their arch rivals, which had Byron "Snake" Jones and Howard Smith as their imports. 
William "Bogs" Adornado wins his second Most Valuable Player Award. He also became the first player to reach the 2,000 point plateau when he scored 24 points in Crispa's title-clinching 101–100 win over Toyota in Game four of the First Conference finals on July 11. 
The first-ever triple-overtime game took place on August 17, Noritake outlasts Tanduay, 153–151, on a jumper by Hubert Filipinas to decide the league's longest match. 
Harry Rogers of 7-Up scored 75 points in their 157–134 win over Fiberlite on October 26, becoming the first PBA player/import to reach the 75-point output in a single game.

Opening ceremonies
The muses for the participating teams are as follows:

Champions
 First Conference: Crispa Redmanizers
 Second Conference: Crispa Redmanizers
 All-Philippine Championship: Crispa Redmanizers
 Team with best win–loss percentage: Crispa Redmanizers (47–15, .758)
 Best Team of the Year: Crispa Redmanizers (1st)

Individual awards
 Most Valuable Player: Bogs Adornado (Crispa)
 Rookie of the Year: Gil Cortez (Toyota)
 Mythical Five:
Francis Arnaiz (Toyota)
Atoy Co (Crispa)
Ramon Fernandez (Toyota)
Bogs Adornado (Crispa)
Philip Cezar (Crispa)

Cumulative standings

Notes
The first and second conference of the season were officially named as All-Filipino Conference and Open Conference respectively. The first All-Filipino Conference was reclassified as an import-laced tournament since the league gave teams the option to hire foreign players or "imports". Both tournaments were renamed as First and Second Conference based on the records under the "Winners circle over the years" section of the official PBA Annual, Hardcourt, since its 2001 edition.

References

 
PBA